Santa Cruz (officially the Municipality of Santa Cruz, is a 1st class municipality in the province of Ilocos Sur, Philippines. According to the 2020 census, it has a population of 41,366 people.

Etymology

The place now known as Santa Cruz was the site where Captain Juan de Salcedo landed to get provisions, especially water, on his way to pacify the North.  As soon as they came ashore, his men went immediately to the top of the highest sand dune and planted a big wooden cross to signify the place has been conquered by the white men (like what they did later in Santa Catalina).  This cross is visible to mariners passing by, often describing the place as "Santa Cruz."  The cross may have vanished, but the name Santa Cruz stuck, especially with natives who became Christians.

Geography

Barangays
Santa Cruz is politically subdivided into 49 barangays. These barangays are headed by elected officials: Barangay Captain, Barangay Council, whose members are called Barangay Councilors. All are elected every three years.

Climate

Demographics

In the 2020 census, Santa Cruz had a population of 41,366.

Economy

Government
Santa Cruz, belonging to the second congressional district of the province of Ilocos Sur, is governed by a mayor designated as its local chief executive and by a municipal council as its legislative body in accordance with the Local Government Code. The mayor, vice mayor, and the councilors are elected directly by the people through an election which is being held every three years.

Elected officials

References

External links

Pasyalang Ilocos Sur
Philippine Standard Geographic Code
Philippine Census Information
Local Governance Performance Management System

Municipalities of Ilocos Sur